Nizhnedevitsky Uyezd was one of the subdivisions of the Voronezh Governorate of the Russian Empire. It was situated in the northwestern part of the governorate. Its administrative centre was Nizhnedevitsk.

Demographics
At the time of the Russian Empire Census of 1897, Nizhnedevitsky Uyezd had a population of 167,183. Of these, 98.9% spoke Russian and 1.1% Ukrainian as their native language.

References

 
Uezds of Voronezh Governorate
Voronezh Governorate